Panare is a district (amphoe) in Pattani province, southern Thailand.

History
The name "Panare" comes from the Pattani Malay language: Pata means pantai in Standard Malay meaning 'beach' and tare means 'otter trawl'. Thus Pata Tare means 'a beach for drying otter trawls in the air'. With time the pronunciation changed to Panare.

Geography
Neighboring districts are (from the south clockwise) Sai Buri, Mayo, and Yaring. To the north and east is the Gulf of Thailand.

Administration
The district is divided into 10 sub-districts (tambons), which are further subdivided into 52 villages (mubans). Panare is a sub-district municipality (thesaban tambon) which covers most of tambon Panare. There are a further 10 tambon administrative organizations (TAO).

Economy
Ban Klang Subdistrict is home to the Chao Lay School (Sea Gypsy School of Fishery), an institution that teaches sustainable fishing and has spurred the rejuvenation of Pattani's fisheries industry, horse crabs in particular.

Gallery

References

External links
amphoe.com (Thai)

Districts of Pattani province